Manyata may refer to
 Manyata Embassy Business Park, Bengaluru, India
 Manyata Dutt, Indian film producer
 Manyata Multi Link Pvt. Ltd., Inaruwa, Nepal